Heysham Port is the port of Heysham, Lancashire, England. It is served by Heysham Port railway station.

History
In 1891, the Midland Railway gave notice of its intention to develop a harbour at Heysham and appointed consulting engineers James Abernethy and his son to undertake a feasibility study of the project. The plan was for an enclosed dock accessed through a lock, this idea made no further progress.

In 1895, a much larger Heysham port plan was put forward by Messrs James Abernethy & Son, in conjunction with the Midland Railway's chief engineer. This formed the basis of the harbour which was built, although there were many changes as work progressed and the full scheme was never completed. In 1896, an enabling Act of Parliament was obtained for the construction of the harbour and the contract for construction was let in July 1897. The project cost about £3 million.

The first ship to dock at Heysham was the Antrim, one of the ships that the Midland Railway had ordered for Heysham services. She came into the harbour on delivery from builders, John Brown at Clydebank on 31 May 1904. The first passenger sailing was a day trip to Douglas, Isle of Man by the Londonderry on 13 August 1904.

Heysham Port was acquired by the Mersey Docks and Harbour Company in May 2001.

Ships in operation
Ships that operate out of Heysham Port

Current routes
The routes which Heysham port offers:

 Heysham - Dublin (Seatruck Ferries)
 Heysham - Warrenpoint (Seatruck Ferries)
 Heysham - Douglas (Isle of Man Steam Packet Co)
 Heysham - Belfast (Stena Line)

References

External links
Official website

Ports and harbours of Lancashire
Peel Ports
Transport in the City of Lancaster